Beverly "Bev" Kinch (born 14 January 1964) is an English former long jumper and sprinter. She held the UK long jump record for 29 years (1983–2012) with 6.90 metres. She is the 1983 Universiade Champion at 100 metres and the 1984 European Indoor Champion at 60 metres. She also represented Great Britain at the 1988 Olympic Games in Seoul.

Career
Kinch was born in Ipswich, Suffolk, England and was a member of the Borough of Hounslow Athletics Club. She competed at the 1982 Commonwealth Games in Brisbane, winning the bronze medal in the long jump with a jump of 6.78 m.

In 1983, aged 19, she came 5th in the long jump final at the World Championships in Helsinki with a wind-assisted 6.93 metres. In the same competition, she set a British record of 6.90 metres, which stood until 2012. In 1983 she also won the gold in the 100 metres at the Universiade in a time of 11.13 (wind-assisted). The US magazine Track & Field News ranked her the seventh best long jumper in the world in 1983.

In 1984, Kinch competed in the European Indoor Championships in Gothenburg, where she won a gold medal in the 60 m sprint in a time of 7.16 seconds. Kinch was an outstanding talent, who seemed to have a brilliant future ahead of her, She earned selection for the 1984 Olympics at both 100 metres and long jump but was forced to withdraw because of injury and was never able to regain her former glory.

At the 1986 European Indoor Championships in Madrid she finished fourth in a time of 7.13 seconds in the 60 m sprint, a British record that stood until Jeanette Kwakye ran 7.08 seconds at the World Indoor Championships in Valencia in 2008.

Kinch competed at the 1988 Olympic Games in Seoul as a member of the UK 4 x 100 metres relay quartet that reached the semi-finals. In 1990, she won a European Championship bronze medal in the relay along with her teammates Stephanie Douglas, Simmone Jacobs and Paula Thomas. That year also saw her run a lifetime best in the 100 m with 11.29 secs. She reached the quarter-finals of the 100 metres at the World Championships in both Tokyo, 1991 and Stuttgart, 1993.

In 1996, Kinch earned relay selection for the Olympic Games, but was forced to withdraw due to injury.

Achievements

References

External links
 
 
 British All-Time lists
 Track & Field News Rankings

1964 births
Living people
Sportspeople from Ipswich
English female long jumpers
English female sprinters
Athletes (track and field) at the 1982 Commonwealth Games
Commonwealth Games medallists in athletics
European Athletics Championships medalists
World Athletics Championships athletes for Great Britain
Commonwealth Games bronze medallists for England
Universiade medalists in athletics (track and field)
Athletes (track and field) at the 1988 Summer Olympics
Olympic athletes of Great Britain
Universiade gold medalists for Great Britain
Medalists at the 1983 Summer Universiade
Medallists at the 1982 Commonwealth Games